The Airco DH.16 was a British four-seat commercial biplane of the 1910s designed by Geoffrey de Havilland, the chief designer at Airco.

Design and development
The DH.16 was a redesigned Airco DH.9A with a wider fuselage, accommodating an enclosed cabin seating four passengers, plus the pilot in an open cockpit. In March 1919, the prototype first flew at Hendon Aerodrome. Nine aircraft were built, all but one being delivered to Aircraft Transport & Travel Limited (AT&T). AT&T used the first aircraft for pleasure flying, then  on 25 August 1919 it inaugurated a London-to-Paris service. One aircraft was sold to the River Plate Aviation Company in Argentina, to operate a cross-river service between Buenos Aires and Montevideo.

AT&T operated the London (Hounslow Heath Aerodrome)-to-Paris service, plus a Croydon Airport-to-Amsterdam service on behalf of KLM. On 17 May 1920, an AT&T DH.16 (G-EALU) flew the first KLM service between London and Amsterdam. In December 1920, AT&T closed down, and the surviving seven aircraft were stored. Two were later used for newspaper delivery flights, and the other five were scrapped. On 10 January 1923, one of the two newspaper delivery aircraft suffered a fatal crash, and DH.16s were withdrawn and scrapped.

Variants
The first six aircraft were powered by a 320 hp (239 kW) Rolls-Royce Eagle inline piston engine; the last three aircraft were fitted with the more powerful 450 hp (336 kW) Napier Lion engine.

Operators

 River Plate Aviation Company – one former AT&T aircraft from 1920.

KLM – services operated by Aircraft Transport and Travel aircraft.

Aircraft Transport and Travel Limited – all nine DH.16s operated from 1919 to 1922.
De Havilland Aeroplane Hire Service – two former AT&T aircraft from 1922 to 1923.

Specifications (DH.16 with Napier Lion engine)

See also

References

Citations

Bibliography

External links

 Conquest of the Air (1936 documentary) includes a brief sequence of G-EACT (G-K-130) of Aircraft Transport & Travel Ltd.

DH.016
1910s British airliners
1910s British civil utility aircraft
Single-engined tractor aircraft
Biplanes
Aircraft first flown in 1919